Mardie Station is a pastoral lease and sheep then cattle station that was established in 1866 in the Pilbara region of Western Australia near the mouth of the Fortescue River. The leasee in 2012 was Fourseasons Corporation; Mardie is operating under the Crown Lease number CL453-1984 and has the Land Act number LA3114/1027.

History
The original pastoral lease was taken by Simpson and MacIntoch, who worked for the Denison Plains Pastoral Company. The company equipped the barque Warrier in Melbourne and had intended to sail to Roebuck Bay to settle in another area but following a succession of calms the ship had to land at Cossack when the stock started to die of dehydration.
Upon landing the group decided to trek south west and eventually squatted at Mardie Springs. The station was established and by 1883 three paddocks were fenced, several wells had been dug and the flock was about 18,000 head of sheep.

The Murray Squatting Company, composed of Cornish, Richardson and the Paterson brothers, sold Yeeda Station in the Kimberley in 1883 and acquired Mardie shortly afterwards paying a "handsome price for the Fortescue River Station". Richardson maintained an interest in Mardie over the next 30 years and invested in other nearby properties including Oakabella, Tallering and Boodarie Stations.

The station was owned at one time by members of the Withnell family who had also established or owned many other stations in the North West including Sherlock, Mount Welcome, Mallina, Karratha, Chirritta and Edjudina.

The stockyards were destroyed and hundreds of sheep were washed away.

James Withnell, the owner of Dirk Hartog Station acquired Mardie in 1913 from the Mardie Pastoral Company.

The station was sold by Withnell to B. H. Sharpe who owned Wooleen Station, along with 30,000 head of sheep and 100 cattle in 1923 for £50,000.

It switched from sheep to cattle in 1998. It is owned by CITIC Pacific, a Hong Kong-based company, who bought the station in 2007.

The station is home to the largest infestation of mesquite in the state, following the introduction of two trees as shade trees around the homestead and shearing shed in the 1930s; it is estimated that around  contain the plant. About  of the infestation is described as dense. Stock must be quarantined in paddocks free of mesquite so the seeds can pass through their guts before they can be moved on to prevent the pest from spreading further.

The station experienced heavy rains followed by flooding during Cyclone Monty in 2004 then again in 2009. Fences were swept away, roads were cut and cattle were stranded when  of rain fell in a few hours.

The property is also home to one of the largest holes ever dug in the earth. The company has a 25-year lease obtained in a deal with billionaire Clive Palmer.

Climate
The station has a hot arid climate (Köppen BWh) with sweltering summers and very warm to hot winters. Rainfall is generally low but highly variable;  of rain fell in the 24 hours to 9:00AM on 10 February 1995, but only  fell in the whole of 1936. 

This temperature was recorded during a heatwave that affected the Pilbara region in February 1998, which also saw several other centres (such as Roebourne) record temperatures above . 

Mardie reached  again on the same day, equalling its own temperature record.

On 19 February 1975, during Cyclone Trixie, it recorded several wind gusts of at least , the highest wind gust in Australia at that time; the figure given was the limit of the anemometer, so the gusts may have been higher than measured.

See also
List of ranches and stations
 List of extreme temperatures in Australia

References

Fortescue River
Homesteads in Western Australia
Pastoral leases in Western Australia